Keep + Animal Collective is the sixth EP by experimental pop band Animal Collective, released on the March 26, 2011 on cassette. Bundled with a range of shoes designed by the band, Keep + Animal Collective contains one solo song from each member of the group.

The EP was released in limited quantities and was only sold in a bundle with the Keep + Animal Collective shoes on a first-come, first-served basis.

"The Preakness" was later included on the deluxe edition of Tomboy, and an alternate version was included on the Crosswords EP.

Tracklisting

References 

2010 EPs
Animal Collective EPs